The Celler–Kefauver Act is a United States federal law passed in 1950 that reformed and strengthened the Clayton Antitrust Act of 1914, which had amended the Sherman Antitrust Act of 1890.

The Celler–Kefauver Act was passed to close a loophole regarding asset acquisitions and acquisitions involving firms that were not direct competitors. While the Clayton Act prohibited stock purchase mergers that resulted in reduced competition, shrewd businessmen were able to find ways around the Clayton Act simply by buying up a competitor's assets. The Celler–Kefauver Act prohibited that practice if competition would be reduced as a result of the asset acquisition.

Sometimes referred to as the Anti-Merger Act, the Celler–Kefauver Act gave the government the ability to prevent vertical mergers and conglomerate mergers which could limit competition.

See also
 Hart–Scott–Rodino Antitrust Improvements Act
 United States v. Continental Can Co.
 Sherman Antitrust Act
 Robinson–Patman Act

References

Bibliography
 
 
 
 
 
  also available as 
 
 
 

1950 in law
81st United States Congress
United States federal antitrust legislation